The  is a social-liberal political party in Japan.

It was founded in October 2017 as a split from the Democratic Party ahead of the 2017 general election. In late 2020, the party was re-founded following a merger with majorities of the Democratic Party for the People and the Social Democratic Party as well as some independent lawmakers. As of 2021, the CDP is considered the primary opposition party in Japan and is the second largest party in the National Diet behind the ruling Liberal Democratic Party.

History

Formation and 2017 election 

The party was formed in the run up to the 2017 general election from a split of the centre-left wing of the opposition Democratic Party (DP). Prior to the election on 28 September 2017, the DP House of Representatives caucus dissolved in order for party members to stand as candidates for Tokyo governor Yuriko Koike's Party of Hope or as independents in the upcoming election.

The new party was launched on 2 October 2017 by DP deputy leader Yukio Edano at a press conference in Tokyo for liberals and left-leaning members of the DP who do not wish to, or were rejected for, contesting the election as candidates for the Party of Hope.

On 3 October 2017, it was announced that the new party would not contest seats where former Democrats were running as Party of Hope candidates, a gesture which was not returned when the Party of Hope ran a candidate in Edano's incumbent district. The Japanese Communist Party (JCP), in turn, pulled their own candidate from running in Edano's district so as to not take away votes from him. The party won a total of 55 seats, becoming the leading opposition party and leading the pacifist bloc (including the JCP and Social Democratic Party) to become the largest opposition bloc.

In July 2020, the CDP became an observer affiliate of the Council of Asian Liberals and Democrats.

2020 merger and refoundation 

On 19 August 2020, the CDP announced that it would merge with the majority of the Democratic Party for the People (DPP) as well as some independent Diet members in September of that year.

On 10 September 2020, the new party elected Edano as leader and also voted to retain the CDP name. Following the merger, the new CDP had a total of 149 members and held 107 seats in the House of Representatives, compared to 156 members and 96 seats held by the Democratic Party in 2016. The independents who joined the CDP in this merger included former Prime Minister Yoshihiko Noda. Several conservative DPP members, including DPP president Yuichiro Tamaki, did not join the CDP and instead formed their own party.

On 14 November 2020, the Social Democratic Party (SDP) voted to agree to a merger arrangement with the CDP, allowing SDP members to leave the party and join the CDP. However, SDP leader Mizuho Fukushima was opposed to the merger agreement and as a result remains in the Social Democratic Party.

The CDP contested the 2021 general election in an electoral pact co-operating with the JCP, Reiwa Shinsengumi and continuing DPP and SDP parties in fielding single opposition candidates in single-seat constituencies. Edano resigned as party leader following the election on 2 November 2021, due to poorer than expected electoral results in which the CDP fell from 110 to 96 seats.

Kenta Izumi was elected as the leader of the CDP in the 2021 Constitutional Democratic Party of Japan leadership election on 30 November 2021. Formerly a member of the Democratic Party for the People he said that the two parties are regarded by the public as "close" and "thought to be like brothers" and "expressed support for a tie-up" between the two.

Ideology and platform

The CDP has been described as liberal and social-liberal, and in favour of constitutionalism. The party has also been described as progressive and centre-left, and following its enlargement in 2020 has variously been described as centrist or centre-left. Within the CDP, there are conservative politicians, as well as social-democratic politicians.

At launch in 2017, the CDP opposed the proposed revision of Article 9 of Japan's postwar constitution. The party supports the phasing out of nuclear energy in Japan, and government investment in renewable energy. The party does not support the legalization and maintenance of casinos. The party also supports "building a society that supports each other and makes full use of individuality and creativity." In their 2017 political programme, the party expressed support for grassroots democracy and diplomatic pacifism. However, apart from the CDP's official support for diplomatic pacifism, the CDP is negative about the Statue of Peace to honor comfort women, victims of Japanese war crimes, and calls on the South Korean government to remove the Statue of Peace.

In 2019, the party pledged to support LGBT rights and the legalization of same-sex marriage in Japan.

The party supported a freeze in the increase of the consumption tax as of 2017, and supports a temporary consumption tax cut as of 2020, along with higher taxes on corporations and wealthy individuals. In the run-up to the 2021 general election, party leader Edano stated his party's support for redistribution of wealth. The 2021 election platform also offered support for progressive taxation, a pledge for additional welfare payments for citizens on low incomes, and raising the capital gains tax rate to 25% by 2023.

Leadership

List of the Leaders

Election results

House of Representatives

House of Councillors

See also

Liberalism in Japan
List of liberal parties
Japan Socialist Party, it was the main opposition party in the "1955 System" against the LDP until the 1990s.
Right Socialist Party of Japan
Conservative mainstream (in Japanese) - Since the 1990s, modern Japansese liberal political parties have been created by the JSP's 'Rightist socialists' and LDP's 'Conservative mainstreamists' of the past.
Japan New Party
Democratic Party of Japan

Notes

References

External links

2017 establishments in Japan
Anti-nuclear organizations
Historical revisionism of Comfort women
LGBT political advocacy groups in Japan
Liberal parties in Japan
Political parties established in 2017
Political parties in Japan
Progressive parties in Japan
Social liberal parties
Centrist parties in Japan
Centre-left parties in Asia